The 1915 Baylor Bears football team represented Baylor University during the 1915 college football season. Baylor won a later-vacated Texas Intercollegiate Athletic Association Championship.

Schedule

References

Baylor
Baylor Bears football seasons
Baylor Bears football